The Women's T20 Challenge was an Indian women's cricket Twenty20 tournament that was held between 2018 and 2022. The tournament featured three teams, playing a round-robin group followed by a final. IPL Supernovas were the most successful team in the history of the tournament, with three title wins.

The tournament was replaced by a new franchise-based annual T20 tournament, the Women's Premier League, which began in 2023.

History
The idea for a women's version of the Indian Premier League was suggested after the 2017 Women's Cricket World Cup, where the India women's national cricket team finished second. The tournament was first introduced in 2018, as a single match held in Mumbai prior to one of the men's matches. The match featured teams named IPL Trailblazers and IPL Supernovas. In 2019, the Women's T20 Challenge was expanded to a three team tournament instead of a one-off match, with a new team called IPL Velocity competing alongside the IPL Trailblazers and IPL Supernovas, in a round-robin format with the top two teams progressing to the final. The 2020 event was postponed due to the COVID-19 pandemic, and held in Sharjah, United Arab Emirates, alongside the rearranged men's IPL.

In November 2020, Board of Control for Cricket in India president Sourav Ganguly suggested an expansion of the Women's T20 Challenge to 7 or 8 teams in 2022. There were suggestions of adding a fourth team for the 2021 season, but this was decided against due to the ongoing issues caused by the COVID-19 pandemic. The 2021 event was postponed along with the men's IPL, with no indication of a date for the women's event being played. It was not held at the same time as the rearranged men's event, as the dates clashed with India women's tour of Australia. In March 2022, the BCCI announced plans to start a women's IPL by 2023, with five or six teams in the inaugural edition. The 2022 event took place in May 2022, to coincide with the playoffs of the men's IPL.

In March 2022, BCCI announced a new franchise-based annual T20 tournament starting in 2023 to replace the Women's T20 Challenge, which was later named the Women's Premier League.

Teams

Tournament results
In the inaugural edition, IPL Supernovas won the match by 3 wickets in a last over thriller.  IPL Supernovas beat IPL Velocity by 4 wickets in the second edition and retained their title. In 2020, IPL Trailblazers beat IPL Supernovas by 16 runs in the third edition and won their maiden title. In 2022, IPL Supernovas won their third title, beating IPL Velocity by four runs in the final.

See also 
 Sports in India - an overview of sports culture in India 
 Women's Premier League
 Indian Premier League

References

Women's T20 Challenge
Twenty20 cricket leagues
Indian domestic cricket competitions
Recurring sporting events established in 2018